A nightmare, also known as a bad dream, is an unpleasant dream that can cause a strong emotional response from the mind, typically fear but also despair, anxiety, disgust or great sadness. The dream may contain situations of discomfort, psychological or physical terror, or panic. After a nightmare, a person will often awaken in a state of distress and may be unable to return to sleep for a short period of time. Recurrent nightmares may require medical help, as they can interfere with sleeping patterns and cause insomnia.

Nightmares can have physical causes such as sleeping in an uncomfortable position or having a fever, or psychological causes such as stress or anxiety. Eating before going to sleep, which triggers an increase in the body's metabolism and brain activity, can be a potential stimulus for nightmares.

The prevalence of nightmares in children (5–12 years old) is between 20 and 30%, and for adults is between 8 and 30%. In common language, the meaning of nightmare has extended as a metaphor to many bad things, such as a bad situation or a scary monster or person.

Etymology
The word nightmare is derived from the Old English , a mythological demon or goblin who torments others with frightening dreams. The term has no connection with the Modern English word for a female horse. The word nightmare is cognate with the Dutch term  and German  (dated).

History/Folklore
The sorcerous demons of Iranian mythology known as Divs are likewise associated with the ability to afflict their victims with nightmares.
The mare of Germanic and Slavic folklore were thought to ride on people's chests while they sleep, causing nightmares.

Signs and symptoms
Those with nightmares experience abnormal sleep architecture. The impact of having a nightmare during the night has been found to be very similar to that of insomnia. This is thought to be caused by frequent nocturnal awakenings and fear of falling asleep. Nightmare disorder symptoms include repeated awakenings from the major sleep period or naps with detailed recall of extended and extremely frightening dreams, usually involving threats to survival, security, or self-esteem. The awakenings generally occur during the second half of the sleep period.

Classification
According to the International Classification of Sleep Disorders-Third Edition (ICSD-3), the nightmare disorder, together with REM sleep behaviour disorder (RBD) and recurrent isolated sleep paralysis, form the REM-related parasomnias subcategory of the Parasomnias cluster. Nightmares may be idiopathic without any signs of psychopathology or associated with disorders like stress, anxiety, substance abuse, psychiatric illness or PTSD (>80% of PTSD patients report nightmares). As regarding the dream content of the dreams they are usually imprinting negative emotions like sadness, fear or rage. According to the clinical studies the content can include being chased, injury or death of others, falling, natural disasters or accidents. Typical dreams or recurrent dreams may also have some of these topics.

Cause

Scientific research shows that nightmares may have many causes. In a study focusing on children, researchers were able to conclude that nightmares directly correlate with the stress in children's lives. Children who experienced the death of a family member or a close friend or know someone with a chronic illness have more frequent nightmares than those who are only faced with stress from school or stress from social aspects of daily life.
A study researching the causes of nightmares focuses on patients who have sleep apnea. The study was conducted to determine whether or not nightmares may be caused by sleep apnea, or being unable to breathe. In the nineteenth century, authors believed that nightmares were caused by not having enough oxygen, therefore it was believed that those with sleep apnea had more frequent nightmares than those without it. The results actually showed that healthy people have more nightmares than sleep apnea patients.
Another study supports the hypothesis. In this study, 48 patients (aged 20–85 yrs) with obstructive airways disease (OAD), including 21 with and 27 without asthma, were compared with 149 sex- and age-matched controls without respiratory disease. OAD subjects with asthma reported approximately 3 times as many nightmares as controls or OAD subjects without asthma. The evolutionary purpose of nightmares then could be a mechanism to awaken a person who is in danger.

Lucid-dreaming advocate Stephen LaBerge has outlined a possible reason for how dreams are formulated and why nightmares occur. To LaBerge, a dream starts with an individual thought or scene, such as walking down a dimly lit street. Since dreams are not predetermined, the brain responds to the situation by either thinking a good thought or a bad thought, and the dream framework follows from there. If bad thoughts in a dream are more prominent than good thoughts, the dream may proceed to be a nightmare.

There is a view, possibly featured in the story A Christmas Carol, that eating cheese before sleep can cause nightmares, but there is little scientific evidence for this.

Severe nightmares are also likely to occur when a person has a fever, these nightmares are often referred to as fever dreams.

Treatment
Sigmund Freud and Carl Jung seemed to have shared a belief that people frequently distressed by nightmares could be re-experiencing some stressful event from the past. Both perspectives on dreams suggest that therapy can provide relief from the dilemma of the nightmarish experience.

Halliday (1987) grouped treatment techniques into four classes. Direct nightmare interventions that combine compatible techniques from one or more of these classes may enhance overall treatment effectiveness:

 Analytic and cathartic techniques
 Storyline alteration procedures
 Face-and-conquer approaches
 Desensitization and related behavioral techniques

Post-traumatic stress disorder
Recurring post-traumatic stress disorder (PTSD) nightmares in which traumas are re-experienced respond well to a technique called imagery rehearsal. This involves dreamers coming up with alternative, mastery outcomes to the nightmares, mentally rehearsing those outcomes while awake, and then reminding themselves at bedtime that they wish these alternate outcomes should the nightmares reoccur. Research has found that this technique not only reduces the occurrence of nightmares and insomnia, but also improves other daytime PTSD symptoms. The most common variations of imagery rehearsal therapy (IRT) "relate to the number of sessions, duration of treatment, and the degree to which exposure therapy is included in the protocol".

Medication
 Prazosin (alpha-1 blocker) appears useful in decreasing the number of nightmares and the distress caused by them in people with PTSD.
 Risperidone (atypical antipsychotic) at a dosage of 2 mg per day, has been shown in case series to remission of nightmares on the first night.
 Trazodone (antidepressant) has been shown in a case report to treat nightmares associated with a depressed patient.

Trials have included hydrocortisone, gabapentin, paroxetine, tetrahydrocannabinol, eszopiclone, xyrem, and carvedilol.

See also
 Bogeyman
 False awakening
 
 Horror and terror
 Mare (folklore)
 Night terror
 Nightmare disorder
 Nocnitsa
 Sleep disorder
 Sleep paralysis
 Succubus
Incubus
A Nightmare on Elm Street, 1984 film

References

Further reading

External links 

 Night-Mares: Demons that Cause Nightmares

Dream
Fear
Sleep disorders